Katsabadianos, is a folk dance with Cretan origin. It is very widespread in Heraklion and Chania.

See also
Music of Greece
Greek dances

References
Ελληνικοί παραδοσιακοί χοροί: Κατσαμπαδιανός

Greek dances